Maryna Mazhula (born 24 April 1983) is a Ukrainian paracanoeist. She is a two-time world champion in the women's KL1 event.

Career
Mazhula won gold at the 2018 ICF Canoe Sprint World Championships in the women's KL1 event. She repeated as champion at the 2019, 2021 and 2022 ICF Canoe Sprint World Championships.

Mazhula represented Ukraine at the 2020 Summer Paralympics in the women's KL1 event and won a silver medal.

References

External links

1983 births
Living people
Sportspeople from Mykolaiv
Ukrainian female canoeists
Paracanoeists at the 2020 Summer Paralympics
Medalists at the 2020 Summer Paralympics
Paralympic medalists in paracanoe
Paralympic silver medalists for Ukraine
ICF Canoe Sprint World Championships medalists in paracanoe
20th-century Ukrainian women
21st-century Ukrainian women